Arantza Quiroga Cía (Irún, 26 July 1973) is a Spanish politician. She was President of the Basque Parliament between 2009 and 2012, an office commonly known in the Anglophone world by the name of "Speaker of the Parliament". Mrs. Quiroga, who has a degree in Law, is a member of the conservative People's Party (PP) and was the leader of the Basque branch of the party until she resigned in 2015.

Born to a father from Valladolid and a Basque mother, she grew up in Irún. She became a member of the Spain-wide People's Party youth movement Nuevas Generaciones at 21 and was elected a local councillor for Irún on the party list. Her political career began to take off three years later, when she gave a speech at a party meeting in Madrid regarding the 20th anniversary of the first democratic elections.

was first elected to the Basque Parliament in the 1998 election for the constituency of Guipúzcoa, and has since had a continuous presence in the chamber (she lost her seat in the 2001 election, but entered parliament because fellow PP MP María San Gil resigned her Guipúzcoa seat shortly after the election). On virtue of a deal between her party and the PSE-EE after the 2009 election, the conservatives announced that she would be their candidate for President of the Basque Parliament. She was elected as Speaker on 3 April 2009, and formally opened the new Parliament with a speech mixing Basque and Spanish.

References

External links
 Basque Parliament: Arantza Quiroga - Bio 

1973 births
20th-century Spanish politicians
20th-century Spanish women politicians
21st-century Spanish politicians
21st-century Spanish women politicians
Living people
Members of the 6th Basque Parliament
Members of the 7th Basque Parliament
Members of the 8th Basque Parliament
Members of the 9th Basque Parliament
Members of the 10th Basque Parliament
People's Party (Spain) politicians
Presidents of the Basque Parliament
Women legislative speakers
People from Irun
Basque women in politics
Municipal councillors in the Basque Country (autonomous community)
Women members of the Basque Parliament